Tasiujaq is an Inuit reserved land (Category I land for Inuit) in Nunavik, in northern Quebec.  Like all Inuit reserved lands in Quebec, it has no resident population (as of the Canada 2011 Census and previous censuses) and is associated with a nearby northern village of the same name: Tasiujaq.

The Inuit reserved land of Tasiujaq consists of two non-contiguous tracts of land, only one of which is adjacent to the northern village of the same name; the other part lies on the opposite (northern) shore of Leaf Lake.

References

Inuit reserved lands in Quebec